Zota of Pergamum, usually referred to as Zota, is a fictional character, a super villain appearing in American comic books published by Marvel Comics. The character, predominantly a foe of Doctor Strange, was created by writer-plotter Stan Lee and artist Steve Ditko. He made his first appearance in Strange Tales #124 (September 1964).

Fictional character biography

1960s
Zota of Pergamum possessed vast knowledge of the mystic arts, which he exploited to cast Cleopatra into a deep trance in 47 BCE, as well as send her to 20th-century New York City. He did so as a form of retaliation against the Egyptian pharaoh for rejecting his love towards her. Doctor Strange discovers Cleopatra and, with the assistance of the Ancient One, travels back in time to end Zota's diabolical ways.

Having had a premonition of Strange's coming, Zota quickly generates a force-field out of light, which entraps Strange. The Sorcerer Supreme hits back by conjuring a billow of smoke, destroying the light prison. After a long showdown leaves Zota exhausted, the victor Strange uses a mystical amulet to hypnotize Zota. He is forced to reveal how to reverse the spell he placed on Cleopatra. Strange later takes away all knowledge of sorcery from Zota and sends them back to ancient Egypt.

1990s
During the Infinity Gauntlet storyline, Thanos the Mad Titan uses his newfound abilities to send Doctor Strange and his fellow sorcery exponent Clea to circa 37 BCE. Their presence is noted by Zota, who at this point in time still has knowledge of magic and is combing the Library of Alexandria for what would become known as the Scroll of Vishanti. His efforts are to no avail, as the scroll has found Zota unworthy to be its owner and has thus magically vanquished from his view.

After being received by Julius Caesar and a younger Cleopatra (in comparison with the one Strange first met), Strange and Clea set off to find the fabled Library of Alexandria. It is there where Strange bumps into Zota for the second time (but it is the first time for Zota). The Egyptian warlock captures Clea and places her in a magical mirror. Holding her ransom, Zota demands the Scroll of Vishanti in exchange for Clea's life. Strange relents and hurls the scroll to him; however, the scroll electrocutes Zota by instinct. With Zota defeated, Strange and Clea call upon Doctor Druid to send them back to the present.

Powers and abilities
As a powerful practitioner of sorcery, Zota is able to project high levels of energy, including "bolts of negative energy from the netherworld". In addition, he is capable of putting people into a trance-like state.

See also

References

External links

Characters created by Stan Lee
Characters created by Steve Ditko
Comics characters introduced in 1964
Marvel Comics male supervillains